Sam Houston was a bodyguard to Gen. George Washington and was one of the first residents of Searsport, Maine.  He is depicted in the painting Washington Crossing the Delaware, and his cutlass and chest are on display at the Penobscot Marine Museum.

Year of birth missing
Year of death missing
18th-century American people
Continental Army soldiers
People of Maine in the American Revolution
Bodyguards
People from Searsport, Maine
George Washington